Katy or Kat(i)e Parker may refer to:

People
Katie Parker, Australian cycling pilot
Katy Parker (table tennis)
Kate Parker, field hockey player

Fictional characters
Katie Parker, character in Funny Bones
Katie Parker, character in Guiding Light
Katie Parker, character in Sorority Wars

See also
Catherine Parker (disambiguation)